Petersville was an Australian food production company.  

The name may also refer to.

Places

Australia
Petersville, South Australia, a locality in the Yorke Peninsula Council

Canada
 Petersville Parish, New Brunswick

United States
Petersville, Alaska
Petersville, Indiana
Petersville, Iowa
Petersville, Maryland, a historic village in southwestern Frederick County
Petersville, Wisconsin, a ghost town